The 2017 NBA Awards were the first annual awards show by the National Basketball Association (NBA), held on June 26, 2017 at Basketball City at Pier 36 in New York City, New York, and hosted by musician Drake.

Winners and finalists
Winners are in boldface.

Honors

NBA All-Defensive Team

NBA All-Rookie Team

Fan Awards
Fan Awards are fan-voted categories in which voting is done online on the league's official website and using social media hashtags.

Winners are in boldface.

Performances

See also
List of National Basketball Association awards

References

External links

NBA Awards
2016–17 NBA season
2017 awards in the United States
2017 sports awards
2017 in sports in New York City